Anthony Rowe or Antony Rowe may refer to:

 Antony Rowe (1924–2003), or Tony Rowe, English rower
 Anthony Rowe (MP) (1640s–1704), English politician, MP for Penryn, Mitchell and Stockbridge
 Anthony Rowe (basketball) (fl 2012), former player for the Plymouth Raiders

See also 
 Rowe (surname)